A Maximum Absorbency Garment (MAG) is an adult-sized diaper with extra absorption material that NASA astronauts wear during liftoff, landing, and extra-vehicular activity (EVA) to absorb urine and feces. It is worn by both male and female astronauts. Astronauts can urinate into the MAG, and usually wait to defecate when they return to the spacecraft. However, the MAG is rarely used for this purpose, since the astronauts use the facilities of the station before EVA and also time the consumption of the in-suit water. Nonetheless, the garment provides peace of mind for the astronauts.

The MAG was developed because astronauts cannot remove their space suits during long operations, such as spacewalks that usually last for several hours. Generally, three MAGs were given during space shuttle missions, one for launch, reentry, and an extra for spacewalking or for a second reentry attempt. It is worn underneath the Liquid Cooling and Ventilation Garment (LCVG).

History

During the Apollo era, astronauts used urine and fecal containment systems worn under spandex trunks. The fecal containment device (FCD) was a bag attached directly to the body with an adhesive seal, and the urine collection device (UCD) had a condom-like sheath attached to a tube and pouch. Women joined the astronaut corps in 1978 and required devices with similar functions. However, the early attempts to design feminized versions of the male devices were unsuccessful. In the 1980s,  NASA designed space diapers which were called Disposable Absorption Containment Trunks (DACTs). These addressed the women's needs since it was comfortable, manageable, and resistant to leaks. These diapers were first used in 1983, during the first Challenger mission.

Disposable underwear, first introduced in the 1960s as baby's diapers then in 1980 for adult incontinence, appealed to NASA as a more practical option. In 1988, the Maximum Absorbency Garment replaced the DACT for female astronauts. NASA created the name Maximum Absorbency Garment to avoid using trade names. Male astronauts then adapted the MAG as well. In the 1990s, NASA ordered 3,200 of the diapers of the brand name Absorbencies, manufactured by a company that has folded. In 2007, about a third of the supply remained.

Usage
The MAGs are pulled up like shorts. A powdery chemical absorbent called sodium polyacrylate is incorporated into the fabric of the garment. Sodium polyacrylate can absorb around 300 times its weight in distilled water. Assuming the astronaut urinates, the diaper would only need to be changed every eight to ten hours. The MAG absorbs the liquid and pulls it away from the skin.

Media attention
These garments gained attention in February 2007, when astronaut Lisa Nowak drove  to attack Air Force officer Colleen Shipman out of jealousy for her former lover. It was stated in a police report that Nowak said she used the diapers to avoid pit stops during her journey. However, Nowak denied these claims and testified that she did not wear these diapers during her trip.

See also
Extravehicular Mobility Unit

References

Space suit components
Undergarments
Diapers
1988 introductions